Swan Creek is a  long 2nd order tributary to Indian River in Sussex County, Delaware.

Course
Swan Creek rises on the Unity Branch divide, about 1 mile southwest of Hollyville in Sussex County, Delaware.  Swan Creek then flows south to meet Indian River at Fishing Point.

Watershed
Swan Creek drains  of area, receives about 45.0 in/year of precipitation, has a topographic wetness index of 704.54 and is about 29.61% forested.

See also
List of rivers of Delaware

References 

Rivers of Delaware